The Rotstock (3,699 m) is a mountain of the Bernese Alps, overlooking the Aletsch Glacier in the Swiss canton of Valais. It lies on the range between the Oberaletsch Glacier and the Aletsch Glacier, south of the Geisshorn.

References

External links
 Rotstock on Hikr

Bernese Alps
Mountains of the Alps
Alpine three-thousanders
Mountains of Valais
Mountains of Switzerland